Lawrence Murphy (1831–1878) was an Irish-American businessman of the Old West, and a main instigator of the Lincoln County War.

Lawrence Murphy may also refer to:
 Lawrence P. Murphy (1910–1975), American politician in the New York State Assembly
 Lawrence C Murphy, accused of child abuse while a Roman Catholic priest
 Larry Murphy (actor) (Lawrence Murphy Jr., born 1972), American actor, voice actor and comedian
 Larry Murphy (ice hockey) (Lawrence Thomas Murphy, born 1961), Canadian ice hockey defenceman
 Lawrence Murphy, character in Young Guns

See also
Larry Murphy (disambiguation)